Monopyle paniculata is a species of plant in the family Gesneriaceae. It is endemic to Ecuador.  Its natural habitat is subtropical or tropical moist montane forests at altitudes of 500-1000m.

References

 Clark, J.L., Monopyle paniculata.

Endemic flora of Ecuador
paniculata
Critically endangered plants
Taxonomy articles created by Polbot